Bror Anders Rexed (19 June 1914 – 21 August 2002) was a Swedish neuroscientist and professor at Uppsala University. Internationally, he is best known today for his development of the system now known as Rexed laminae, but in Sweden, he is also known for his involvement in the "du-reformen" of the Swedish language during the late 1960s.

In 1980, he was awarded the Léon Bernard Foundation Prize.

References

External links
 Bio at uu.se
 Léon Bernard Foundation Prize

1914 births
2002 deaths
Swedish civil servants
Swedish neurologists
Academic staff of Uppsala University
People from Arvika Municipality
Léon Bernard Foundation Prize laureates